Betchworth is a village and civil parish in the Mole Valley district of Surrey, England.

Service sector occupations dominate Betchworth's economy – its station and road links make it a part of the London commuter belt – combined with crop agriculture and services for a relatively large retired proportion of the population. A former lime quarry, rebuilt manor house and Grade I-listed church are within its boundaries.

History

Toponymy
State records show the name as Becesworde (11th century), Beceswrde (12th century) and Bechesworth (13th century). The name is generally agreed to mean a "farm or enclosure belonging to a person or family called Becci".

Pre-Roman settlement

Bronze Age artefacts have been found at Betchworth only since 1944.  No Roman villas, farms or camps have been found.

Medieval period
Betchworth lay within the Wotton hundred and appears in two entries   in the Domesday Book of 1086 as Becesworde, held by Richard Fitz Gilbert, Richard de Tonebrige.  In the Domesday survey its assets were: 27 villagers/smallholders, 15 slaves, two hides; one church, two mills worth £1 10 s, 12 ploughlands,  of meadow, pasture for five swine and woodland and herbage/woodland worth 81 hogs. To its overlords it rendered in total £7 10s. A distinct part named Thorncroft is mentioned in the first listing which was split by five overlords in 1066 before the conquest, Lewis (1848) and Malden (1911) say this relates to the formerly detached part in the west that is now between Brockham and Dorking.

Part of the village was reclassified in the 13th century. Subsequently, the east of the village became part of Reigate hundred. Ownership of Betchworth Manor passed to Hamelin de Warenne, Earl of Surrey, who did villein service on Friday's Mead as Lord of (among others) Reigate and Betchworth in 1279. Hamelin's grandson John de Warenne, 6th Earl of Surrey owned much land in Surrey and his widow left the land to his nephew the Earl of Arundel, who eventually left the manor to Lord Abergavenny. The 9th Lord Abergavenny sold it in 1629 for £1,080 to Sir Ralph Freeman, in whose family's hands it remained until 1817 when it was sold to Henry Goulburn.

Two manors existed within the boundaries of today's village: Wonham, which still stands today, and Betchworth. A third manor, Brockham, became a separate village to the west.

Wonham Manor, a grade II listed building, forms the eastern corner of the parish and for centuries owned Wonham Mill at the foot of the Shag Brook, which is a tributary of the River Mole, on the boundary with Buckland.

Post-Reformation
A manorial system continued for a long period in this village; the great tithes were commuted for £295 15s 4d, and the vicarial (lesser tithes) for £20.

Post-Industrial Revolution
A school was endowed with £20 per annum as at 1848 four other significant endowment charities existed then and continued though were less significant due to inflation through to at least 1911 for the benefit of the poor.

Betchworth lime quarries

To supply the cement for construction associated with required brick built housing, a rich seam of suitable chalk and limestone was identified in the North Downs. Broome Park estate, extending to the top of the hill, included some of these quarries and was integral to the Dorking Grey Stone and Lime Company and the North Downs Line's spur lines leading to these three pits.  After an Act authorising the railway from Reading to Reigate was passed in 1847 and its construction, opening in 1849 the Betchworth Quarry Railways were built.  To calcinate the lime from the stone, lime kilns were required.  The six of the lime kilns along the Pilgrims' Way footpath in Betchworth are Scheduled Ancient Monuments, including Hoffman, Dietz and Six Flare kilns.
In 1911 A History of the County of Surrey by Malden which is also a county guide, records the earlier key dates in the industry and records that "the chalk furnishes the chief industry...There are also brickyards in the parish, which is, however, mostly agricultural and residential".

Accomplished surgeon to George IV, William IV and Queen Victoria, Sir Benjamin Collins Brodie, lived and died at Broome Park  a nursing home since 1993 with 11 acres at the top end of The Street.

In 1924 a hydrator plant at Betchworth Limeworks was installed for slaking the lime.

Landmarks
Betchworth Conservation Area contains 22 listed buildings and the church of St Michael, the only Grade I building.

Betchworth Castle
The ruins of Betchworth Castle in Betchworth Park are a couple of miles west of Betchworth in the west of Brockham civil parish.

St Michael's Church
St Michael's Church, Betchworth is Church of England, immediately northwest of the village green and is Grade I listed.  Most of the church on the Betchworth site now occupied by St Michael's dates to the early 13th century, and in a pillar of the tower's south window there remains a fragment of the stone Saxon church. The south aisle chapel became known as the Hope Chapel after Henry Thomas Hope bought the Manor in 1838.

A tall war memorial is outside of the main west entrance of the building.  A particular fine example of medieval Gothic architecture pointed arches is in this church throughout its long nave and forming the entrance to its alcoves.

It was used for the first scene of Richard Curtis's film Four Weddings and a Funeral (1994).  And with the church behind you the village street was used for the very first shot in David Lean's film Lawrence of Arabia (1962).

Betchworth House
Architecturally Grade II*-listed Betchworth House is the largest building in the village, excluding Hartsfield Manor Hotel on the opposite bank of the Sloughs brook, and was built by the lord of the manor in 1675.  Erected by the Freeman local Lords of the Manor after Ralph Freeman, judge, auditor and tin trader bought the manor in 1629 which the House replaced. A painting now in the house shows its appearance then, with corner towers. It was extended and re-faced in 1808 and again 1820. The house is constructed of red brick covered in stucco, tiled roofs behind parapets, long slated roofs to the back forming eaves and features sash windows. Merstham stone (of the North Downs) forms its main entrance surround—a "Gibbs-style door surround with pulvinated frieze and rusticated, arched, surround". Half-oval balconies are to the first floor windows.  Marble columns are in the rear room. The house was further modified in the 1980s by architect Sir William Whitfield.

The stables in front of Betchworth House by the Street are separately listed.

Humphry Repton produced a Red Book for the estate in 1801 which is still held at the house.

Broome Park
Broome Park is a Grade II listed early 19th century house. It was the home of Sir Benjamin Brodie, the royal physician. After his death in 1862, it was sold to General Sir Percy R. B. Feilding, son of the 7th Earl of Denbigh, and was later the home of his daughter, Lady Louisa Feilding (d.1918). It is now a nursing home.

Local Government

County
Falling within the county of Surrey, a third tier of local government is responsible for education, almost all built infrastructure and other services such as social care.

Surrey County Council is elected every four years and has one representative, from Betchworth for Dorking Rural: 
Helyn Clack, (Con) who participates in these committees:
Cabinet Member for Community Services and the 2012 Games decisions
People, Performance and Development
The Mole Valley local committee (obligatory)
The second party forming the main local opposition in the 2013 election, was the Liberal Democrats gaining 1,527 votes versus the winning candidate's 1,810.

District
Betchworth is in the east of Mole Valley District Council area, in which the main town is Dorking.
Two councillors sit on Mole Valley District Council, who are:

Parish
At the local level Betchworth Parish Council provides certain local facilities and services.

Parliamentary Constituency

Betchworth is within Mole Valley parliamentary constituency.

Geography

Location

Elevation
Elevations range from 216 m at the water tower, which marks the highest point of the parish on Box Hill, down to the River Mole, which runs east–west through the village at 43 m AOD. Between these extremes the landscape is mainly undulating, except for the steep (and where quarried for several hundred metres, sheer) chalk face of the North Downs.

Geology & Soil
Formation of the North Downs and the erosion that has taken place widely with repeated sea inundations and deposition is described in detail in the Geology of Surrey. Mammoth fossilised bone remains have been found below flint beds under considerable clay in the low hills by the bank of the River Mole in Betchworth.

Most of the parish has free draining slightly acid loamy soil.  Soil of the area that forms the top of the Betchworth Hills is "free draining, slightly acid but base-rich soil" rather than "shallow, lime-rich soil over chalk or limestone" which dominates the middle of Box Hill. This is the natural spur to the trees that line the top as it produces extremely fertile pastures and deciduous woodland. Surrey Wildlife Trust manages the rare flower meadows beneath the old quarry.

The land rises towards the North Downs AONB. Below this range of hills the Mole flows briefly along the Vale of Holmesdale and the area around its tributary the Gadbrook is within the village.

Demography & Housing
In 2001 Betchworth comprised 372 households and 12 vacant houses, shops and country businesses such as stone merchants and garden centres.

In the 2001 census, Betchworth had 919 residents, of whom 26.5% were aged over 65; 4.8% of the population were in full-time further education; 74.5% of all men were economically active whereas 2.5% were unemployed and 4.2% worked part-time; 56.1% of all women were economically active whereas 1.6% were unemployed and 35.1% worked part-time.

In the 2001 census 98.5% of the population identified as white, 0.7% as mixed and 1.3% as one of the four other main categories (five including mixed).

In 2001 74.7% of the population identified themselves as Christian, 0.7% as Muslim, 1.4% other religions, 13.4% as atheist. 10.5% declined to state a religious affiliation.

Betchworth's economy is predominantly a service sector economy reflected by the low concentration at one end of the official categorisation table of occupation given, compiled from the 2001 census:

Whereas 34.3% of the population worked in middle or higher professional occupations.

The average level of accommodation in the region composed of detached houses was 28%, the average that was apartments was 22.6%.

The proportion of households in the civil parish who owned their home outright compares to the regional average of 35.1%. The proportion who owned their home with a loan compares to the regional average of 32.5%. The remaining percent is made up of rented dwellings (plus a negligible percentage of households living rent-free).

Economy
Betchworth's economy is predominantly a service sector economy. With its rail station and road links it forms part of the London commuter belt.  Cleaning and gardening companies find a strong local market. Crop, chicken and pasture agriculture as well as a relatively large retired proportion of the population. The former lime quarry is managed by workers from Surrey Wildlife Trust and English Heritage.

Great Brockhamhurst Farm is one of eleven farms in Betchworth and produces cereals and breeds horses. Root Hill farm is a farm and missionary camp.  Local businesses include an air filters company. Yellow Pages: Westbury Filters, Betchworth and kennels.

Hartsfield Manor Hotel is a major local employer with a long entrance drive off Sandy Lane has  of parkland containing a small gatehouse called Ye Olde Gatehouse and serves also as a Wedding and conference venue.

Betchworth Park Golf Club holding in its grounds the ruined Betchworth castle is in Brockham though keeps the historic association with Betchworth.

Culture & Community

Memorial Hall
Betchworth Memorial Hall is a large village hall with a wooden floor, a high ceiling and a stage, making it suitable for self-nominated activities including badminton, lectures, receptions, and local operatics and drama, with seating for 150 people; leads to a smaller community room, the Geoffrey Browne Room, for 40/50 people available for hire separately. There is a 21st-century construction kitchen which can serve either hall, and all are available for hire.

Hamilton Room
An Archives/Meeting Room, The Hamilton Room, suitable for meetings of 30/40 people, and small parties with adjoining kitchen and all amenities, is situated in conservation area Church Street in the centre of the village. Within it is a room housing village archives, known as the Meg Ryan Room.

Public house
The public house in Betchworth is The Dolphin which is near the church and opposite the blacksmith. It has flagstone floors, log fires and a large rear garden.

Village Green
Goulburn Green, the alternative name for the Village Green has stalls and maypole dancing in the children-costumed May bank holiday Medieval Fayre, hosts occasional summer celebrations and is the venue of the Harvest Lunch in alternate years. James Hamilton donated the Green.

Allotments
Betchworth parish council operates six full size allotments at the rear of The Walled Garden allocated at a nominal fee.

Post Office
A Post Office with banking facilities is on Old Reigate Road, to the north of the village.

Local Walks
A popular local pastime is walking because in the Vale of Holmesdale and elsewhere. The Parish Council website has details of four walks.

Transport

Railways
Trains call at Betchworth at approximately hourly intervals in each direction in the morning and evening peaks and at two-hourly intervals off-peak.  The route is known as the North Downs Line and runs between the stations of Reading and Gatwick Airport.  Other stations along this route include Dorking (Deepdene), Guildford, Reigate and Redhill.

Roads
The A25 road that runs from the county of Kent to Guildford via Reigate and Dorking skirts the north of the village centre.  From its roundabout on the A25, less major roads provide a cut-through towards Walton-on-the-Hill, via the notoriously steep Pebble Hill, a route towards Sutton, London, the M25's Reigate Hill junction or Leatherhead and minor routes to the south connect southern villages, including Leigh, Surrey.  A-road intersections of the A25 are in Dorking (A24) and at the foot of Reigate Hill in Reigate (A217).

Notable people
Sir Ralph Freeman (abt 1590–1650)
 Sidonie Goossens, harpist, lived at Woodstock Farm, Gadbrook Road, Betchworth from 1949 until her death, aged 105, in December 2004.
Henry Hare, 3rd Baron Coleraine (1693–1749)
Henry Goulburn, Chancellor of the Exchequer (1828) and slave owner at his Jamaican estate, Amity Hall
John Hamilton, 3rd Baron Hamilton 
Lord James Hamilton (1938–2006) Lord-in-waiting to the Queen
Norton-Griffiths Baronets, Baronetcy of Wonham (1922)

Education
North Downs Primary School is state-paid and has ones of its three sites in the village.

Notes and references
Notes 
  
References

External links

 

Villages in Surrey
Mole Valley
Civil parishes in Surrey